The Seance is a mystery novel by Iain Lawrence, first published in 2008. It is set in America in the 1920s. The main character is thirteen-year-old illusionist Scooter King, who lives with his mother the medium, helping her to host seances and make a small living.

Scooter admires Harry Houdini, a famous magician and escape artist. He cannot wait to see him escape from his deadly Torture Tank.

One night, Scooter stumbles on a dead man in the Torture Tank. Little does he know that the dead man is Herman Day. A few days later, Harry Houdini comes to town.

2008 Canadian novels
2008 children's books
Canadian young adult novels
Canadian mystery novels
Children's mystery novels
Fiction set in the 1920s
Cultural depictions of Harry Houdini